The 35 kilometres race walk is a road racewalking event which became a standard championship discipline in 2022, with initial world records to be recognised after 1 January 2023.

All-time top 25

Men
Correct as of July 2022.

Notes
Below is a list of other times equal or superior to 2:27:26:
Sergey Bakulin also walked 2:24:53 (2018).
Vladimir Kanaykin also walked 2:25:59 (2008).
Masatora Kawano also walked 2:26:40 (2022).
Miguel Ángel López also walked 2:26:49 (2022).
Denis Nizhegorodov also walked 2:27:08 (2011).
Tomohiro Noda also walked 2:27:18 (2022).

Women
Correct as of August 2022.

Notes
Below is a list of other times equal or superior to 2:48:46:
Qieyang Shijie alsow walked 2:43:06 (2022).
Margarita Nikiforova also walked 2:41:28 (2022), 2:43:14 (2021), 2:44:00 (2019).
Kimberly Garcia also walked 2:43:19 (2022).
María Pérez also walk 2:44:17 (2021).
Darya Golubechkova also walked 2:44:29 (2022).
Eleonora Giorgi also walked 2:45:21 (2019).
Li Maocuo also walked 2:45:46 (2022), 2:46:12 (2022).
Serena Sonoda also walked 2:45:48 (2022).
Antigoni Ntrismpioti also walked 2:47:00 (2022) and 2:47:48 (2022).
Laura García-Caro also walked 2:48:05 (2022).
Raquel González also walked 2:48:40 (2021).

World Championships medalists

Men

Women

References

Racewalking distances